José Ayala Lasso (born in Quito on 29 January 1932) is a retired Ecuadorian lawyer and diplomat, currently residing in Quito. He served as Foreign Minister of Ecuador on three occasions. He was the firstUnited Nations High Commissioner for Human Rights

Career 
Pursuant to United Nations General Assembly Resolution A/RES/48/141 of 20 December 1993 Dr. Ayala Lasso was appointed first United Nations High Commissioner for Human Rights and started his four-year mandate on 5 April 1994.

His first important challenge was to give contours to his mandate and establish the credibility of the Office. Barely appointed, he had to address the crisis caused by the genocide in Rwanda. His years as High Commissioner were marked by a continuous effort to give greater visibility to the United Nations human rights programme. Thus, he opened field offices in all regions of the world and traveled extensively to confer with leaders worldwide. His vision was to transform the former Centre for Human Rights from a passive conference-services secretariat into a pro-active centre of excellence with an expert secretariat and an expanded mandate to conduct projects throughout the world. Under his leadership the office should develop an operational capacity similar to that of the Office of the High Commissioner for Refugees. His priorities were crisis management, prevention and early warning, assistance to States in transition to democracy, the right to development, and the expansion of national human rights institutions. As an administrator. he is remembered fondly by the staff because of his openness and kindness. Less successful were the efforts at restructuring, primarily because of the failure of the UN General Assembly to approve an adequate budget for the Office.

Dr. Ayala Lasso resigned on 31 March 1997 to return to Ecuador to broker the peace negotiations between Ecuador and Peru, which led to the conclusion of the Treaty of 1998, settling the border dispute. In his diplomatic career he was Ecuador's Ambassador to the United Nations and twice President of the Security Council. During the 48th session of the United Nations General Assembly in 1993, he chaired the working group responsible for the implementation of the Vienna Declaration and Programme of Action, which had been adopted at the World Conference on Human Rights in 1993. One of the recommendations of the Vienna Conference had been the establishment of the post of United Nations High Commissioner for Human Rights. He also served also as Ecuadorian Ambassador to the European Economic Communities, to France, Belgium, Luxembourg, Peru and the Vatican. He continues to be an active human rights advocate and is an active participant of "Project 2048" of the University of California at Berkeley, which aims at the creation of a World Court of Human Rights.

References 

 Jose Ayala Lasso, Asi se gano la Paz, Pablo Cuvi Editor, Quito, Ecuador, 2009. .
 José Ayala Lasso, "Defining the Mandate. New UN Efforts to Protect Human Rights", Harvard International Review, Winter 1994/95, pp. 38–78.
 José Ayala Lasso, "Making Human Rights a Reality in the twenty-first century" in: Emory International Law Review, vol. 10 (1996) pp. 497–508.
 José Ayala Lasso, Report of the UN High Commissioner for Human Rights on his Mission to Rwanda 11–12 May 1994 (UN Doc. E/CN.4/S3/3)
 Report of Jose Ayala Lasso, High Commissioner for Human Rights, to the 1995 session of the Commission on Human Rights, E/CN.4/1995/98, para. 133.
 Statement by the High Commissioner for Human Rights to a joint meeting of the Commission's rapporteurs, representatives, experts and working groups, E/CN.4/1995/5/Add.1, p. 6.
 Statement by Jose Ayala-Lasso, High Commissioner for Human Rights, to the 1996 session of the Commission, 9 April 1996.
Report of Jose Ayala-Lasso, High Commissioner for Human Rights, E/CN.4/1996/103. 
 Ayala Lasso, Jose. In: Encyclopedia of Human Rights, edited by David P. Forsythe. New York and Oxford: Oxford University Press, 2009. Volume 1, pages 130-132.
 Alfred de Zayas, "United Nations High Commissioner for Human Rights" in Rudolf Bernhardt (ed.), Encyclopaedia of Public International Law, Vol. IV, pp. 1129–1142.
 Alfred de Zayas, "Human Rights, United Nations High Commissioner", in Helmut Volger (ed.), Concise Encyclopedia of the United Nations, Kluwer, 2002, pp. 216–223; 2nd revised edition 2009, .
 Jakob Th. Möller, "United Nations Human Rights Committee Case Law 1977-2008", N.P.Engel Verlag, Kehl/Strasbourg, 2009, p. 7, 
 Kirk Boyd, "2048. Humanity's Agreement to live together". Barrett-Kohler Publishers, San Francisco, 2010.  .

External links
 http://www.alfreddezayas.com/Law_history/Ayala2005_de.shtml
 http://www.alfreddezayas.com/Law_history/Ayalaenglish.shtml

1932 births
Living people
People from Quito
Ecuadorian diplomats
20th-century Ecuadorian lawyers
Foreign ministers of Ecuador
Ambassadors of Ecuador to China
Ambassadors of Ecuador to Japan
Ambassadors of Ecuador to Belgium
Ambassadors of Ecuador to Luxembourg
Ambassadors of Ecuador to the European Union
Ambassadors of Ecuador to Peru
Permanent Representatives of Ecuador to the United Nations
United Nations High Commissioners for Human Rights
Ecuadorian officials of the United Nations